John Heavner is an American football coach.  He served as the head football coach at Dordt College in Sioux Center, Iowa from 2007 to 2011, compiling a record of 7–44.

Head coaching record

References

External links
 Southeastern Oklahoma State profile
 Dordt profile

Living people
Year of birth missing (living people)
American football tight ends
Dordt Defenders football coaches
East Central Tigers football coaches
East Central Tigers football players
Southeastern Oklahoma State Savage Storm football coaches
Missouri State Bears football coaches
Sportspeople from Norman, Oklahoma